Nizhnemancharovo (Tübänge Manşır) is a rural locality (a selo) in Semiletovsky Selsoviet, Dyurtyulinsky District, Bashkortostan, Russia. The population was 549 as of 2010. There are 5 streets.

Geography 
Nizhnemancharovo is located 24 km southwest of Dyurtyuli (the district's administrative centre) by road. Karalachuk is the nearest rural locality.

References 

Rural localities in Dyurtyulinsky District